William Edwin McMahan (born August 13, 1944) was a  Republican member of the North Carolina General Assembly representing the state's one hundred fifth House district, including constituents in Mecklenburg county. A businessman from Charlotte, North Carolina, McMahan served as a major fundraiser for President George W. Bush in both the 2000 and 2004 election cycles.

In 2008, McMahan stepped down from his position as an RNC national committeeman, to assist Charlotte Mayor Pat McCrory's bid to become North Carolina Governor. Pat McCrory won the Republican primary election, but was defeated in the general election by Lieutenant Governor Bev Perdue.

He has a B.S. in Industrial Relations from the University of North Carolina, Chapel Hill.

References

External links

|-

|-

1944 births
Living people
Politicians from Charlotte, North Carolina
Businesspeople from Charlotte, North Carolina
Republican Party members of the North Carolina House of Representatives
21st-century American politicians